Diosdado González Marrero is a Cuban dissident.

He was a member of the Peace, Democracy and Liberty Party. He was imprisoned during the Black Spring crackdown on dissidents in 2003, and named a prisoner of conscience by Amnesty International.

González Marrero's wife Alejandrina García de la Riva reports that she been harassed:

References

Amnesty International prisoners of conscience held by Cuba
Cuban democracy activists
Cuban dissidents
Living people
Cuban prisoners and detainees
Year of birth missing (living people)